Mikhail Mikhailovich Ippolitov-Ivanov (28 January 1935) was a Russian and Soviet composer, conductor and teacher. His music ranged from the late-Romantic era into the 20th century era.

Biography 

He was born in 1859 at Gatchina, near St. Petersburg, where his father was a mechanic employed at the palace. His birth name was Mikhail Mikhailovich Ivanov; later he added Ippolitov, his mother's maiden name, to distinguish himself from a composer and music critic with an identical name (Mikhail Ivanov). He studied music at home and was a choirboy at the cathedral of St. Isaac, where he also had musical instruction, before entering the St. Petersburg Conservatory in 1875. In 1882 he completed his studies as a composition pupil of Rimsky-Korsakov, whose influence was to remain strong.

Ippolitov-Ivanov's first appointment was to the position of director of the music academy and conductor of the orchestra in Tiflis, the principal city of Georgia, where he was to spend the next seven years. This period allowed him to develop an interest in the music of the region, a reflection of the general interest taken in the music of non-Slav minorities and more exotic neighbours that was current at the time, and that was to receive overt official encouragement for other reasons after the Revolution. One of his notable pupils in Tiflis was conductor Edouard Grikurov.

On 1 May 1886, in Tiflis, he conducted the premiere of the third and final version of Tchaikovsky's Romeo and Juliet Overture-Fantasia.

In 1893 Ippolitov-Ivanov became a professor at the Conservatory in Moscow, of which he was director from 1905 until 1924. He served as conductor for the Russian Choral Society, the Mamontov and Zimin Opera companies and, after 1925, the Bolshoi Theatre, and was known as a contributor to broadcasting and to musical journalism.

Politically, Ippolitov-Ivanov retained a measure of independence. He was president of the Society of Writers and Composers in 1922, but took no part in the quarrels between musicians concerned either to encourage new developments in music or to foster a form of proletarian art. His own style had been formed in the 1880s under Rimsky-Korsakov, and to this he added a similar interest in folk-music, particularly the music of Georgia, where he returned in 1924 to spend a year reorganizing the Conservatory in Tiflis. He died in Moscow in 1935.

His pupils included Reinhold Glière and Sergei Vasilenko.

Music
Ippolitov-Ivanov's works include operas, orchestral music, chamber music and a large number of songs. His style is similar to that of his teacher Rimsky-Korsakov. With the exception of his orchestral suite Caucasian Sketches (Kavkazskiye Eskizi, 1894), which includes the much-excerpted "Procession of the Sardar", his music is rarely heard today.

As well as his entirely original works, Ippolitov-Ivanov completed Modest Mussorgsky's opera Zhenitba.

He was awarded the Order of the Red Banner of Labour in 1934.

Works 

  Caucasian Sketches
 Suite No. 1, Op. 10 (1894)
 Suite No. 2, Op. 42 (Iveria) (1896)
 Symphony No. 1 in E minor, Op. 46 (1908)
 Yar-khmel (Spring Overture), Op. 1 (1882)
 Violin Sonata, Op. 8 (published by D. Rahter of Leipzig, 1887, Score from Sibley Music Library Digital Scores Collection)
 Quartet for piano and strings, Op. 9 
 String Quartet No. 1 in A minor, Op. 13 (published c. 1890)
 Ballade Romantique for violin and piano, Op. 20 (published by Universal Edition in 1928)
 Symphonic Scherzo, Op. 2
 Three Musical Tableaux from Ossian, Op. 56
 Lake Lyano
 Kolyma's Lament
 Ossian's Monologue on Contemporary Heroes
 Liturgy of St. John Chrysostom, Op. 37
 Vespers, Op. 43
 Jubilee March, Op. 67
 Armenian Rhapsody on National Themes, Op. 48
 Turkish Fragments, Op. 62 (1930)
 Turkish March, Op. 55 (1932)
 An Episode from the Life of Schubert, Op. 61 (1920)

References

External links 
 

 Mikhail Mikhailovich Ippolitov-Ivanov image
 Lyrics for some of his songs at the LiederNet Archive
 Brief Biography
 

1859 births
1935 deaths
19th-century classical composers
19th-century male musicians
20th-century classical composers
20th-century Russian male musicians
Composers from the Russian Empire
Conductors (music) from the Russian Empire
People from Gatchina
People from Tsarskoselsky Uyezd
Academic staff of Moscow Conservatory
Academic staff of Tbilisi State Conservatory
Recipients of the Order of the Red Banner of Labour
Russian conductors (music)
Russian male classical composers
Russian opera composers
Russian Romantic composers
Soviet conductors (music)
Soviet male classical composers
Soviet opera composers
Burials at Novodevichy Cemetery